Seyyed Mosque may refer to:

Seyyed Mosque (Isfahan), mosque from the Qajar era in Isfahan
 Another name for the Jameh Mosque of Zanjan, congregational mosque of Zanjān city, Iran